Nankana Sahib Tehsil , is an administrative subdivision (tehsil) of Nankana Sahib District in the Punjab province of Pakistan. The city of Nankana Sahib is the headquarters of the tehsil, until 2005 it was a tehsil of Sheikhupura District, but in that year Sheikhupura was bifurcated and the district of Nankana Sahib was created.

References

Nankana Sahib District